New York City Emergency Management (NYCEM) (formerly the New York City Office of Emergency Management (OEM)) was originally formed in 1996 as part of the Mayor's Office under Rudolph W. Giuliani. By a vote of city residents in 2001 it became an independent agency, headed by the commissioner of emergency management.  In 2006 the office was reorganized under the deputy mayor for administration by Mayor Michael Bloomberg.

Agency structure
The agency is responsible for oversight and development of the city's emergency management plans. NYCEM regularly tests plans by conducting drills and exercises, and responds to emergencies to ensure that other agencies not only follow these plans, but to foster communication amongst the responding agencies. NYCEM also operates the city's Emergency Operations Center (EOC) where city, state and federal agencies join representatives from the private and nonprofit sectors to coordinate complex responses to emergencies and disasters.

The agency also developed and runs the Notify NYC emergency alert program, by which citizens can sign up to receive phone and email alerts about emergencies and events happening in their neighborhoods.

The agency is also the administrator of New York City's community emergency response teams. Each community emergency response team (CERT) is coterminous with one or more New York community boards.

New York City Emergency Management maintains the Citywide Incident Management System which is based on the National Incident Management System.

The former commissioner of NYCEM is Deanne Criswell, a former FEMA official and head of OEM for the city of Aurora, Colorado. After Criswell became FEMA Administrator, John Scrivani was named commissioner.

7 WTC and post-9/11 buildings
From 1999 until September 11, 2001, New York City's Emergency Operations Center was housed on the 23rd floor of the 7 World Trade Center building. Prior to the decision to use 7 World Trade Center, MetroTech Center, in Brooklyn, was also considered for the Emergency Operations Center.

Richard Sheirer was the director of the OEM at the time of the September 11 attacks, and thus became in charge of the city's rescue and recovery effort. As the office in the World Trade Center was severely damaged, OEM was temporarily housed at Pier 92 of New York Passenger Ship Terminal on Manhattan's West Side. Pier 92 was chosen because OEM had scheduled a bio-terrorism exercise for September 12, 2001 called Operation TriPOD. (The exercise was later conducted on May 22, 2002.)

Before moving into the new building, OEM was located in a warehouse beneath the Brooklyn Bridge.

New building
The new structure formerly served as the New York City headquarters for the American Red Cross of Greater New York.  The $50 million project, funded by the federal government, called for the fifty-year-old building to be completely gutted and outfitted with the latest in audio-visual and communications technology.

On December 5, 2006, Mayor Michael Bloomberg joined OEM commissioner Joseph F. Bruno, former OEM directors Richard Sheirer and John Odermatt, NYCEM personnel, and a host of other dignitaries to unveil the agency's new state-of-the-art headquarters. The new facility, located at 165 Cadman Plaza East in Downtown Brooklyn. It replaces the agency's former offices that were located on the 23rd floor of 7 World Trade Center, the 47-story building that collapsed in the September 11, 2001 attacks.

It contains general offices for NYCEM staff, several conference rooms, the Joint Information Center (a press corps composed of press officers from several city agencies who disseminate information to the public), a state-of-the-art media briefing room, Watch Command, and the city's Emergency Operations Center (EOC). There is also space for senior officials to meet and the building is staffed 24-hours a day, seven days a week.

The nerve center of NYCEM is its Watch Command. It is staffed 24/7 with representatives from the city's public safety agencies. They monitor police and fire broadcasts and dispatch NYCEM Field Responders if an incident warrants. Watch Commanders also have access to New York City's 911 systems and are responsible for alerting local, state, and federal officials of emergencies. They maintain direct contact with the New York State Emergency Management Office and surrounding jurisdictions to lend support or aid if needed.

NYCEM's new headquarters is home to the Emergency Operations Center. The EOC serves as a central clearinghouse where local, state, and federal agencies can gather to assess and respond to a number of emergencies. Activated for numerous events, the new EOC contains workstations for some 130 city, state, federal, and non-profit agencies. There is secure communications equipment, large video displays, and space for Geographic Information Systems. The new structure also has the distinction of being New York City's first “green” agency headquarters utilizing energy-saving and environmentally sound construction techniques. OEM qualifies for the Leadership in Energy and Environmental Design (LEED) Silver certification for its new building.

According to Commissioner Bruno at the unveiling ceremonies, “New York City is at the forefront of emergency management planning and this new facility will continue to move us forward.”

Post-disaster modular housing

NYCEM has shipping container based modular temporary post-disaster housing units for evaluation next to its headquarters. The units were designed by Garrison Architects and can be stacked up to four stories high. The prototype building consists of a  single bedroom top floor and two  three-bedroom floors.

Agency executives
 Jerome Hauer - Director from 1996-2000
 Richard Sheirer - Director from  2000-2002
 John T. Odermatt - Director from April 4, 2002 - December 2003
 Joseph F. Bruno - Commissioner March 4, 2004 - June 27, 2014
 Joseph Esposito - Commissioner June 27, 2014 - June 30, 2019 
 Deanne Criswell - Commissioner July 1, 2019 - 2021 
 John Scrivani - Commissioner 2021
 Andrew D’Amora - Commissioner 2021 - January 2, 2022
 Christina Farrell - Acting Commissioner - January 3 to February 17, 2022
 Zach Iscol - Commissioner February 17, 2022 to present

See also
 United States government operations and exercises on September 11, 2001
 Rescue and recovery effort after the September 11 attacks on the World Trade Center
 Notify NYC

References
Notes

Bibliography

External links 

  Press Release, Office of Mayor Michael R. Bloomberg
 NYCEM Agency History

 
Emergency Management, Office of
New York
Downtown Brooklyn
Government buildings in Brooklyn
1996 establishments in New York City